The Cowichan Valley Capitals are a Junior "A" ice hockey team based in Duncan, British Columbia, Canada. They are members of the Island Division in the British Columbia Hockey League (BCHL). They play their home games at Cowichan Community Centre.

Season-by-season record
Note: GP = Games played, W = Wins, L = Losses, T = Ties, OTL = Overtime Losses, Pts = Points, GF = Goals for, GA = Goals against, PIM = Penalties in minutes

Honored members
The Capitals have only one number retired:
10. Matt Ellison

NHL alumni

Laurent Brossoit
Geoff Courtnall
Matt Ellison
Dean Evason
Dan Hodgson
Geoff Kinrade

Awards and trophies
Cliff McNabb Memorial Trophy
1994

Chevrolet Cup
2004

Bob Fenton Trophy
Mike Hammond: 2010
Alexandre Gagne: 2005
Mike McKay: 2000

Brett Hull Trophy
Matt Ellison: 2002

Bruce Allison Memorial Trophy
Kevin Robertson: 1988Defensive Award
Zack Currie: 2009
Jim Gattolliat: 1997

Goaltending Award
Tim Boron: 2003
Tim Boron: 2002

Joe Tennant Memorial Trophy
Scott Robinson: 2007
Scott Robinson: 2004

Vern Dye Memorial Trophy
Chris Rawlings: 2009
Kevin Lachance: 2004
Tim Boron: 2003
Jordan Watt: 2000

Wally Forslund Memorial Trophy
Tim Boron/Jason Dupis: 2002

See also
List of ice hockey teams in British Columbia

References

External links
Official website of the Cowichan Valley Capitals
Official website of the British Columbia Hockey League

British Columbia Hockey League teams
Ice hockey teams in British Columbia
Duncan, British Columbia
1980 establishments in British Columbia
Ice hockey clubs established in 1980